Royal Air Force station Skipton-on-Swale or more simply RAF Skipton-on-Swale is a former Royal Air Force station operated by RAF Bomber Command during the Second World War. The village of Sandhutton is located just to the east. RAF Skipton-on-Swale was a sub-station of RAF Leeming.

History
The airfield opened in autumn 1942, becoming operational in May 1943.

Skipton-on-Swale was originally a 4 Group facility and first hosted 420 Squadron, Royal Canadian Air Force (RCAF), which moved to RAF Middleton St. George in October 1942. Skipton was assigned to No. 6 Group, Royal Canadian Air Force (RCAF) in January 1943. RCAF squadrons stationed here included 424 Squadron, No. 432 Squadron (which moved to RAF East Moor in September 1943), and 433 Squadron. Both squadrons flew the Halifax bomber until replaced by the Lancaster in January 1945. 424 Squadron lost 52 aircraft and 433 Squadron lost 38 aircraft.

Nos. 424 and 433 Squadrons were disbanded in October 1945. After this the airfield was closed. The station was not used again and has since reverted largely to farmland. The site is home to turkey and pig farms.

In 1984, veterans of the RCAF, including survivors of the crash of an RCAF Halifax in the area,  and other Air Force representatives and local residents, gathered in the village for a commemoration of the wartime base. A cairn to 6 Group was dedicated and a Lancaster of the Battle of Britain Memorial Flight made a flypast.

Operational units and aircraft

References

Citations

Bibliography

External links
 RAF Skipton-on-Swale at RAF History - Bomber Command 60th Anniversary
 Wartime memories project
 Control Towers

History of North Yorkshire
Royal Air Force stations in Yorkshire
Royal Air Force stations of World War II in the United Kingdom
Military units and formations disestablished in 1945
Military history of North Yorkshire